At least two ships of the Hellenic Navy have borne the name Vasilefs Georgios after King George I of Greece:

 , an armoured corvette launched in 1868 and scrapped in 1915.
 , a destroyer launched in 1938. In 1942 she was commissioned into the Kriegsmarine first as ZG3 and then as Hermes. She was scuttled in 1943.

Hellenic Navy ship names